Judith Frances English (nee Milne, born 1 March 1940) is a British academic administrator, the principal of St Hilda's College, Oxford, from 2001 to 2007.

In 2006, under her leadership, St Hilda's which had been the last women-only college at Oxford, ended its 113-year ban on male students. Since 2010, English has been dean of scholars at the Oxford Centre for Islamic Studies.

English is married to the cardiac surgeon Sir Terence English.

References

1940 births
Living people
Principals of St Hilda's College, Oxford